Oleg Alekseyevich Grinevsky (3 June 1930 – 5 February 2019) was a Russian diplomat, former Ambassador to Sweden, political scientist, Cand.Sc. (history) and author.

Early life
Oleg Grinevsky was born in Moscow, in what was then the Russian SFSR, part of the Soviet Union.

Diplomatic activity
 Ambassador Extraordinary and Plenipotentiary.
 former Soviet security adviser to the Nikita Khrushchev, Leonid Brezhnev, Yuri Andropov, Mikhail Gorbachev and Boris Yeltsin governments
 Graduated from MGIMO (Moscow State Institute for International Relations) in 1954.
 Joined the Ministry of Foreign Affairs, USSR in 1957.
 Senior Adviser at the Soviet Embassy in Washington, D.C., 1954.
 1983-1989 Head of the Soviet delegation at the Stockholm conference
 1989-1991 Head of the Soviet delegation at the Vienna conference
 1991-1997 Russian Ambassador to Sweden
 Since 1999 - scientist, political researcher, author of political and historical books
 Awarded the Swedish Order of the Polar Star (2009)

International conferences activity
 Participated in the numerous international conferences on security and nuclear security issues.

References

External links
http://www.vegapress.com/foreignauthorsbios.shtm
http://www.eloquentbooks.com/MakingPeace.html
http://www.ohio.edu/conhist/pastevent.html

1930 births
2019 deaths
Ambassadors of the Soviet Union to Sweden
Ambassadors of Russia to Sweden
Moscow State Institute of International Relations alumni
Commanders First Class of the Order of the Polar Star
Recipients of the Order of Friendship of Peoples
Diplomats from Moscow